Hajji Qareh (also Romanized as Ḩājjī Qareh; also known as Ḩājjī Qūsh) is a village in Gorganbuy Rural District, in the Central District of Aqqala County, Golestan Province, Iran. At the 2006 census, its population was 549, in 104 families.

References 

Populated places in Aqqala County